HMCS Snowberry was a  that was originally built for the Royal Navy, but spent most of the war in service with the Royal Canadian Navy. She fought primarily as a convoy escort during the Second World War. She served primarily in the Battle of the Atlantic.

Background

Flower-class corvettes like Snowberry serving with the Royal Canadian Navy during the Second World War were different from earlier and more traditional sail-driven corvettes. The "corvette" designation was created by the French for classes of smaller warships just below a frigate in size and power, but above a sloop or gunvessel; the Royal Navy borrowed the term for a period during the 19th Century, but discontinued its use after the 1880s, with the introduction of a new rating system for cruising warships. During the hurried preparations for war in the late 1930s, Winston Churchill reactivated the corvette designation, needing a name for smaller ships used in an escort capacity, in this case based on a whaling ship design. The generic name "flower" was used to designate the class of these ships, which – in the Royal Navy – were named after flowering plants.

Construction
Snowberry was ordered by the Royal Navy (RN) 22 January 1940 as part of the 1939-1940 Flower-class building program. She was laid down by George T. Davie & Sons Ltd. at Lauzon on 24 February 1940 and launched on 8 August 1940. She was commissioned into the RN on 26 November 1940. She sailed to the United Kingdom in February 1941 and was completed at Greenock in April 1941. On 15 May 1941 Snowberry was one of ten corvettes loaned to Canada. She could be told apart from other Canadian Flowers by her lack of minesweeping gear and the siting of the after gun tub amidships.

During her career Snowberry had three significant refits. The first took place at Charleston beginning in December 1941 and taking six weeks to complete. Her second overhaul took place again at Charleston from March 1943 until 14 May 1943. In late March 1944 she went to Baltimore, Maryland for a five-week refit.

War service

Royal Navy
After completing at Greenock and working up at Tobermory, Snowberry was assigned to Western Approaches Command. In June 1941, she sailed for Newfoundland after being loaned to the Royal Canadian Navy.

Royal Canadian Navy
Upon her arrival in Newfoundland in June 1941 she joined Newfoundland Command as a convoy escort between St. John's and Iceland. From July to October 1941 she was deployed as such. She departed for a short refit and upon her return in February 1942 she was briefly deployed as an ocean escort once again.

In March 1942 Snowberry transferred to Western Local Escort Force (WLEF). In June 1942, after the U-boats had begun attacking oil tankers sailing along the North American coast, she joined the newly formed Tanker Escort Force. In September 1942 she was placed under American control escorting convoys between Guantánamo and New York.

She returned to service after her second major refit in August 1943, when she was assigned to Royal Navy controlled escort group EG 5. On 23 August 1943 Snowberry as part of the 5th Support Group, was deployed to relieve the 40th Escort Group which was undertaking a U-boat hunt off Cape Ortegal. The warships of both groups were attacked by 14 Dornier Do 217s and 7 Junkers Ju 87s that were carrying a new weapon the Henschel Hs 293 anti-ship guided missile.

When the group replaced its corvettes with frigates in March 1944, Snowberry departed for her final refit. After workups she was briefly assigned to WLEF again but transferred to Portsmouth Command in mid-September 1944. She remained with them until she was decommissioned by the Royal Canadian Navy.

Post-war service
Snowberry was paid off from the RCN on 8 June 1945 when she was returned to the Royal Navy at Rosyth. In 1946 she was used as a target ship off Portsmouth. Her remains were sold for scrap and in August 1947 she was broken up at Middlesbrough.

Notes

References
The Naval Museum of Manitoba's page devoted to HMCS Snowberry .
Uboat.net page devoted to HMCS Snowberry.
HMCS Snowberry on the Arnold Hague database at convoyweb.org.uk.

External links
 HMCS SNOWBERRY Ship's Company February 1945 – Portsmouth, England 

Flower-class corvettes of the Royal Canadian Navy
Flower-class corvettes of the Royal Navy
1940 ships